Charles Erastus Hickey (March 24, 1840 – September 19, 1908) was a physician and political figure in Ontario, Canada. He represented Dundas in the House of Commons of Canada from 1882 to 1891 as a Conservative member.

He was born in Williamsburg, Upper Canada, the son of John Hickey. Hickey was educated at Victoria University in Cobourg and McGill University. In 1873, he married Mary Elizabeth Beers. Hickey also served as an inspector of schools.

References 
 
The Canadian parliamentary companion, 1889, AJ Gemmill

1840 births
1908 deaths
Members of the House of Commons of Canada from Ontario
Conservative Party of Canada (1867–1942) MPs
Physicians from Ontario
McGill University alumni